と, in hiragana, or ト in katakana, is one of the Japanese kana, each of which represents one mora.  Both represent the sound , and when written with dakuten represent the sound .  In the Ainu language, the katakana ト can be written with a handakuten (which can be entered in a computer as either one character (ト゚) or two combined characters (ト゜) to represent the sound , and is interchangeable with the katakana ツ゚.

Stroke order

The Katakana ト is made from two strokes:
A vertical stroke on in the center;
A line pointing downwards towards the right.

Other communicative representations

 Full Braille representation

 Computer encodings

References

Specific kana